The 1933 USSR Chess Championship was the 8th edition of USSR Chess Championship. Held from 16 August to 9 September in Leningrad. The tournament was won by Mikhail Botvinnik.

Table and results

References 

USSR Chess Championships
Championship
Chess
1933 in chess
Chess